Stan King  (birth unknown – death unknown) was an Australian rugby league footballer who played for the Eastern Suburbs club and for Glebe.

References

Australian rugby league players
Sydney Roosters players
Glebe rugby league players
Rugby league second-rows
Rugby league hookers
Rugby league locks
Year of birth missing
Year of death missing
Place of birth missing
Place of death missing